Haywood Franklin Jeffires (pronounced "Jeffries"; born December 12, 1964) is an American former professional football player who was a wide receiver in the National Football League (NFL). He was selected by the Houston Oilers in the first round (20th overall) of the 1987 NFL Draft out of North Carolina State. A 6'2", . receiver, Jeffires played in 10 NFL seasons from 1987 to 1996.

Biography
Jeffires was born in Greensboro, North Carolina and attended high school at Walter Hines Page High School and college at North Carolina State University. From 1983 to 1986, he registered 111  receptions for 1,733 yards and 14 touchdowns at NC State. In the 1987 NFL Draft, Jeffires was the first selection for the Houston Oilers and the 20th pick overall.

Jeffires played wide receiver for the Oilers between 1987 and 1996. He played most of his career with the Oilers during the "Run & Shoot" era with Warren Moon. The Run & Shoot also incorporated teammates Ernest Givins, Drew Hill, Webster Slaughter, and Curtis Duncan. A 3-time Pro Bowl selection from 1991 to 1993, Jeffires led the AFC in receptions in 1991 with 100.

, Jeffires is coaching the Bay Area Gamblers, a semipro football team in Pearland, Texas. Though his last name is spelled Jeffires, it is pronounced Jeffries, a fact that commentators often noted during broadcasts of games in which Jeffires was playing.  1991 Nintendo Entertainment System console game, Tecmo Super Bowl, incorrectly listed Jeffires' name as "Jeffries".

Jeffires currently resides in suburban Houston with his wife, Robin, and their two children, Andrea and Haywood III. Jeffires remains beloved and active in the Houston community, devoting countless hours assisting special needs children, and is frequently tapped for personal appearances and interviews.

References

1964 births
Living people
American football wide receivers
Houston Oilers players
NC State Wolfpack football players
New Orleans Saints players
American Conference Pro Bowl players
Players of American football from Greensboro, North Carolina